North Maclagan is a rural locality in the Toowoomba Region, Queensland, Australia. In the  North Maclagan had a population of 5 people.

History 
The locality is named for being north of the town of Maclagan. The town was originally named Bismarck after Otto von Bismarck. Due to the anti-German sentiment during World War I, the town was renamed Maclagan in honour of Brigadier Ewen George Sinclair-Maclagan in 1916.

Maclagan North State School opened on 12 September 1922. It closed on 4 May 1962.

In the  North Maclagan had a population of 5 people.

References 

Toowoomba Region
Localities in Queensland